Skin is the 14th studio album by Peter Hammill, originally released on vinyl on Foundry Records in 1986 and later re-released on CD on Virgin Records. It was also released on CD by DaTE (a division of Line Music GmbH).

The album was notable for spawning a Peter Hammill single, "Painting by Numbers", which appeared on both 7" and 12" formats. It was the 11th (and until now last) single by Hammill. The B-side was the non-album track "You Hit Me Where I Live". This track later appeared on the Virgin CD release of the album. As usual, none of these releases entered the UK charts. The DaTE CD release included two extra tracks, the aforementioned "You Hit Me Where I Live" plus "Painting by Numbers" (Extended Version).

The album sees Hammill employing the Yamaha DX7, the first commercially successful digital synthesiser, an instrument which was typical for the sound of the 1980s and which he plays until today. He also made use of an Emu Drumulator drum machine.

Track listing 
All songs by Peter Hammill, except where indicated.

"Skin"
"After the Show"
"Painting by Numbers"
"Shell"
"All Said and Done"
"A Perfect Date"
"Four Pails" (Chris Judge Smith, Max Hutchinson)
"Now Lover"

Personnel 
Hugh Banton – cello
David Coulter – didjeridu
Guy Evans – percussion, drums
Stuart Gordon – violin
Peter Hammill – guitar, keyboards, vocals
David Jackson – saxophone
David Luckhurst – voices

Technical
Peter Hammill - recording engineer (Sofa Sound)
Coach, Neil Perry, Stephen Street – recording engineers, mixing (The Wool Hall, near Bath)
Paul Ridout – engineer, cover art
Arun Chakraverty – original mastering

References

External links 

 Lyrics on Hammill's Sofa Sound website

Peter Hammill albums
1986 albums